Bosnia and Herzegovina competed at the 2016 Summer Olympics in Rio de Janeiro, Brazil, from 5 to 21 August 2016. This was the nation's seventh consecutive appearance at the Summer Olympics.

The Olympic Committee of Bosnia and Herzegovina (OKBIH) sent the nation's largest ever delegation to the Games. A total of 11 athletes, 7 men and 4 women, were selected to the team across five different sports (athletics, judo, shooting, swimming, and tennis).

Athletics
 
Bosnian athletes have achieved qualifying standards in the following athletics events (up to a maximum of 3 athletes in each event):

Men
Track & road events

Field events

Women
Track & road events

Judo
 
Bosnia & Herzegovina has qualified one judoka for the women's heavyweight category (+78 kg) at the Games. Larisa Cerić was ranked among the top 14 eligible judokas for women in the IJF World Ranking List of 30 May 2016.
Women

Shooting
 
Bosnia and Herzegovina has received an invitation from the Tripartite Commission to send a women's 10 m air rifle shooter to the Olympics.

Women

Qualification Legend: Q = Qualify for the next round; q = Qualify for the bronze medal (shotgun)

Swimming

Bosnia and Herzegovina has received a Universality invitation from FINA to send two swimmers (one male and one female) to the Olympics.

Men

Women

Tennis

Bosnia and Herzegovina has received an invitation from the Tripartite Commission to send 2010 Youth Olympic bronze medalist Damir Džumhur (world no. 87) in the men's singles into the Olympic tennis tournament, signifying the nation's return to the sport for the first time since 2004.

On 19 July 2016, Džumhur was confirmed as a direct entrant to the men's singles, due to the withdrawal of several tennis players from the Games. Hence, his invitation was transferred to fellow player Mirza Bašić (world no. 130).

Men

See also
Bosnia and Herzegovina at the 2016 Summer Paralympics

References

External links 
 

Olympics
2016
Nations at the 2016 Summer Olympics